XHZUM-FM is a radio station in Zumpango on 88.5 FM, owned by the government of the State of Mexico. It is part of the Radio Mexiquense state radio network.

XHZUM was added in 2002 as part of an expansion of Radio Mexiquense with four new FM stations.

References

Radio stations established in 2002
Radio stations in the State of Mexico
Public radio in Mexico